Chen Xu (born 15 July 1985) is a former Chinese footballer. He played for the second team of third-tier club Guangzhou Sunray Cave Easter, Sunray Cave, in the Hong Kong First Division.

Career statistics

Club

Notes

References

1985 births
Living people
Footballers from Meizhou
Footballers from Guangdong
Chinese footballers
Association football midfielders
Hong Kong Premier League players
Guangdong Sunray Cave F.C. players
Hubei Istar F.C. players
Chinese expatriate footballers
Chinese expatriate sportspeople in Hong Kong
Expatriate footballers in Hong Kong